Lisbeth Hummel (born 1952 in Copenhagen,  Denmark) is a Danish film actress. She is known for the controversial 1975 film La Bête, directed by Walerian Borowczyk, and La bella e la bestia and Dangerous Women, both directed by her husband Luigi Russo. She is now working as an artist, and lives in Denmark and Italy.

References

External links
 

Living people
1952 births
Danish actresses
Actresses from Copenhagen